Azadi is a 2005 Australian short film written and directed by Anthony Maras, and produced in association with the Australian Film Commission, the Adelaide Film Festival Investment Fund and the South Australian Film Corporation.

The film has earned numerous accolades on the international festival circuit and has screened on broadcast television, festivals and at human rights events.

Synopsis
Azadi follows the plight of an Afghan schoolteacher and his asthmatic son who escape their oppressive Taliban homeland in search of a new life in Australia.

Cast

Awards and nominations
2005 Australian Film Institute Awards: Best Short Fiction Film – Nomination
2006 St Kilda Film Festival: Judges Special Commendation
2005 Palm Springs International Festival of Short Films: Critics and Audience Choice commendation
2005 Austin Film Festival: Best Short Film – Nomination
2005 Hamptons International Film Festival – Films of Conflict and Resolution Award – Nomination
2005 ATOM Awards: Best Short Film – Nomination

References

External links

Austin Chronicle – Capsule Review
South Australian Film Corporation – Azadi Showcase
– Azadi at Flickerfest 2006

2005 films
2005 short films
Australian drama short films
Films directed by Anthony Maras
2000s English-language films